Bruce Johnson may refer to:
Bruce Johnson (gridiron football) (born 1987), American football cornerback
Bruce Johnson (Canadian executive) (active since 1992), Canadian executive
Bruce Johnson (journalist) (1950–2022), American journalist
Bruce Johnson (Ohio politician) (born 1960), American politician
Bruce Johnson (Wisconsin politician) (1875–1932), American politician, Wisconsin state senator from 1927 to 1931
Bruce Johnson (minister) (1938–1969), Methodist minister in Chicago
W. Bruce Johnson, American businessman

See also
Bruce Forsyth-Johnson or Bruce Forsyth (1928–2017), English entertainer
Bruce Johnston (disambiguation)
Bruce Johnstone (disambiguation)